The Two Nations theory can refer to:
 Two-Nation Theory, the view that Muslims and Hindus in Colonial India were separate nations
 Two Nations Theory (Ireland), the view that the Northern Ireland Protestants are a distinct Irish nation
 Deux nations or Two Solitudes (Canadian society), the view that French and English Canada are separate nations

See also
 Austro-Hungarian Compromise of 1867
 Biculturalism
 Binational solution
 Dualism (disambiguation)
 Hyphen War
 Multinational state
 Parallel state
 Taksim (politics)
 Two Chinas
 The two Spains
 Two-state solution